Kaija Lustila (born 8 November 1965) is a Finnish singer. She first came to fame as a tango singer; now her repertoire includes evergreens, iskelmä and Finnish pop.

Biography
Lustila was born in Kurikka. Her career began in 1982, when she had the opportunity to audition with Risto Oja-Lipasti's band. Within a few years she had made such an impression on the dancing public that she formed her own band, Pajero, with herself as solo singer. (Latva & Tuunainen p 254)

In 1987 she entered the prestigious Tangomarkkinat competition and reached the finals, though she did not win. One of her fellow competitors was Aura Stenroth, the mother of 2007 Tango King Henri Stenroth. (Nyman p 220)

Her first album was "Sellaiset silmät" (Eyes Like These) in 1992. Other albums followed in 1994, 1999, 2004 and 2011. In 1999 she took part in the Sysyn sävel competition with "Kaukainen tähti" (Faraway Star). (Latva & Tuunainen p 254)

In 2009 she took part in the Tangomarkkinat again, and came second to Amadeus Lundberg. It was unfortunate for her that the rules had changed to allow only one winner; under the previous rules a male and a female winner were chosen, and she would have been Tango Queen. (Ilkka 12 July 2009)

Kaija is an enthusiastic dancer herself and maintains that danceability is a necessity when it comes to music. (Latva & Tuunainen p 255)

Discography
Albums
 1992 Sellaiset silmät 
 1994 Kaija Lustila
 1999 Meitä tansittaa
 2004 Sydän ohjaa
 2009 Tangomarkkinat 22 (1 track)
 2011 Näiden tähtien alla

Singles
 1992 Sellaiset silmät & Tule kanssani
 1993 Sinun aina & Armonaikaa & Liisa ihmemaan
 1993 Sinun aina & On sellainen ihmisen mieli
 1994 On sellainen ihmisen mieli & Tänne minä kuulun & Sydämet
 1999 Anna pois muistot
 1999 (Syksyn sävel) Kaukainen tähti
 2003 Mikä mies

Sources
 Marja Nyman, Tangokuninkaalliset, Revontuli 2002, 
 Tony Latva and Petri Tuunainen, Iskelmän tähtitaivas, WSOY 2004,

External links

 Tangomarkkinat
 Official fansite

1965 births
Living people
20th-century Finnish women singers
Finnish tango musicians
People from Kurikka
21st-century Finnish women singers